Wacker is a surname. Notable people with the surname include:

Charles H. Wacker (1856–1929), American businessman and philanthropist
Jimmy Wacker (1883–1948), American professional baseball pitcher for the Pittsburgh Pirates
Frans Wackers (born 1939), Dutch nuclear cardiologist
Fred Wacker (1918–1998), American engineer and president of two Chicago companies, also a socialite, a jazz musician, and a racing driver
Grant Wacker (born 1945), American historian of religion in America
Ingrid Wacker, German film editor
Jim Wacker (1937–2003), American football coach and college athletics administrator
Lou Wacker (born 1934), former Canadian football player who played for the Calgary Stampeders
Otto Wacker (1898–1970), German art dealer who became infamous for commissioning and selling forgeries of paintings by Vincent van Gogh